Pansey is an unincorporated community in Houston County, Alabama, United States. Pansey has a post office with ZIP code 36370.

Demographics
According to the 1910 U.S. Census, Pansey incorporated in 1902, a year before Houston County was created (then in Henry County). It disincorporated at some point after 1920.

Notable person
Lucy Baxley, Lieutenant Governor of Alabama from 2003 to 2007, was born in Pansey.

References

Unincorporated communities in Houston County, Alabama
Unincorporated communities in Alabama